Pinedjem II was a High Priest of Amun at Thebes in Ancient Egypt from 990 BC to 969 BC and was the de facto ruler of the south of the country. He was married to his full sister Isetemkheb D (both children of Menkheperre, the High Priest of Amun at Thebes, by Isetemkheb III, hence both nephew, niece and grandchildren of Psusennes I) and also to his niece Nesikhons, the daughter of his brother Smendes II. He succeeded Smendes II, who had a short rule.

His children by Isetemkheb D were:
 Psusennes II
 Harweben, a Chantress of Amun; buried at Bab el-Gasus
 (?) Henuttawy, God's Wife of Amun

By Neskhons he had four children: two sons, Tjanefer and Masaharta, and two daughters, Itawy and Nesitanebetashru.

When Pinedjem II died, his mummy, along with those of his wives and at least one daughter, Nesitanebetashru, were interred in the tomb DB320 at Deir el-Bahri, above the Mortuary Temple of Hatshepsut. Subsequently, the mummies of other previous Theban-based rulers, including the much earlier New Kingdom pharaohs Ahmose I, Amenhotep I, Thutmose II, Thutmose III, Ramesses I, Seti I, Ramesses II, and Ramesses IX were gathered together and also laid in this tomb, which was revealed in 1881. This was done to prevent their remains from being robbed as their graves have been looted by many ancient tomb raiders.

References

Further reading
 Battiscombe Gunn, The Decree of Amonrasonther for Neskhons, JEA 41 (1955), 83-95
 J.-M. Kruchten, Le grand texte oraculaire de Djéhoutymose, intendant du domaine d’Amon sous le pontificat de Pinedjem II, MRE 5, 1986.
 Andrzej Niwiński, The Wives of Pinudjem II -a topic for discussion, JEA 74 (1988), 226-230

External links

High Priests of Amun 1080 - 775 (Thebes), accessed July 23, 2006
Pinudjem II, accessed July 23, 2006

Theban High Priests of Amun
People of the Twenty-first Dynasty of Egypt
10th-century BC clergy
Ancient Egyptian mummies